Pavla Švrdlíková (born September 15, 1990) is a Czech basketball player for BK Handicap Brno and the Czech national team.

She participated at the EuroBasket Women 2017.

References

1990 births
Living people
Sportspeople from Přerov
Power forwards  (basketball)
Czech women's basketball players